
The Spits of the Sea of Azov are narrow strips of land in the Sea of Azov which can be as long as 112 km (Arabat Spit, the world's longest spit), 45 km (Fedotov Spit), 31 km (Achuevsk Spit), 30 km (Obitochna Spit) and 23 km (Berdyansk Spit). Their total length exceeds 300 km which is larger than the width of the sea (about 180 km).

Most of the spits were formed as a result of deposition of sand, silt and shells by the river flows into the Azov Sea bays. Therefore, many spits stretch to the south into the sea and are continuations of the (right) river banks (see table and map). The Chushka and Tuzla spits are located inside the Strait of Kerch; the former spit is formed by the outflow of water from the Azov Sea to the Black Sea and therefore also faces south, whereas the latter is facing north. A major oil spill occurred near those spits on November 11, 2007.

Most spits have a triangular base and numerous lagoons on their west side. The ends of some spits are widened and bent westwards. Their shape rapidly varies with time. For example, the Arabat Spit (the largest and most stable spit on the Azov Sea) was formed only around 1100–1200 AD, and some spits were partly or entirely washed away by water currents. Many spits are used as resting ground by migrating birds (mostly ducks, geese, swans, sandpipers, great cormorants and seagulls, see e.g. this and this pictures) and therefore some are declared national nature reserves. Examples are Beglitsk,
Belosaraysk, Krivaya and Berdyansk Spits. In addition to bird colonies, Belosaraysk and Berdyansk Spits also host more than 200 vegetation species each. Berdyansk Spits is remarkable by having one of the oldest lighthouses on the Azov Sea (160 years old). Petrushino Spit is historical in that in 1697, Peter I built a major fortress at its base. In July 1711, a Turkish landing operation was defeated there.

Major spits

See also
Sea of Azov

References

External links
Azov spits

 
Azov
Azov